WOW Hits 2003 is a compilation album featuring the best in Contemporary Christian music from 2002. It included thirty songs plus three bonus tracks on two CDs.  The album peaked at No. 34 on the Billboard 200 chart.  It was certified as platinum in sales in 2003 by the Recording Industry Association of America (RIAA).

Track listing

See also 

 WOW Hits

References 

2002 compilation albums
WOW series albums
WOW Hits albums